The Brantley County Courthouse is a historic courthouse for Brantley County in Nahunta, Georgia. It was listed on the National Register of Historic Places on June 14, 1995. It is located at 117 Brantley Street.

Hoboken, Georgia was Brantley County's original county seat and the county's first courthouse was built there in 1921, a year after the county's creation. In 1923 the legislature designated Nahunta as Brantley's county seat. A two-story brick courthouse was built in Nahunta in 1930 and remains the county courthouse today. An addition was added in 1978.

See also
National Register of Historic Places listings in Brantley County, Georgia

References

External links
 

Buildings and structures in Brantley County, Georgia
County courthouses in Georgia (U.S. state)
Courthouses on the National Register of Historic Places in Georgia (U.S. state)
Government buildings completed in 1930
National Register of Historic Places in Brantley County, Georgia